= Louise Bond =

New Zealand advertising executive

Louise Bond is a New Zealand advertising executive. She was chair of the New Zealand Commercial Communications Council until her retirement in January 2019; she was the first woman to hold the position.

In 1999 she and two business partners established Spark, a media agency which became the largest spender of media in the New Zealand market within the first 5 years of operation. In 2000, Bond opened Spark PR & Activate, a marketing communications business, and in 2007 she opened PHDiQ, a digital operation specialising in online strategy, search and social media management.
